The Old Ship Church (also known as the Old Ship Meetinghouse) is a Puritan church built in 1681 in Hingham, Massachusetts. It is the only surviving 17th-century Puritan meetinghouse in America. Its congregation, gathered in 1635 and officially known as First Parish in Hingham, occupies the oldest church building in continuous ecclesiastical use in the United States. On October 9, 1960, it was designated a National Historic Landmark and on November 15, 1966, it was added to the National Register of Historic Places.

Old Ship Church is, according to The New York Times, "the oldest continuously worshiped-in church in North America and the only surviving example in this country of the English Gothic style of the 17th century. The more familiar delicately spired white Colonial churches of New England would not be built for more than half a century." Within the church, "the ceiling, made of great oak beams, looks like the inverted frame of a ship," notes The Washington Post. "Built in 1681, it is the oldest church in continuous use as a house of worship in North America."

The most distinctive feature of the structure is its Hammerbeam roof, a Gothic open timber construction, the most well-known example being that of Westminster Hall. Some of those working on the soaring structure were no doubt ship carpenters; others were East Anglians familiar with the method of constructing a hammerbeam roof.

History

The first minister of the Hingham congregation who built Old Ship was the Rev. Peter Hobart, who had attended what was then Puritan-dominated University of Cambridge. Natives of Hingham in the county of Norfolk in East Anglia, Peter Hobart, his father Edmund and his brother Capt. Joshua Hobart were among Hingham's most prominent early settlers. Edmund Hobart and his wife Margaret (Dewey), said Cotton Mather, "were eminent for piety ... and feared God above many." Assisting Hobart in the foundation of the congregation was Rev. Robert Peck, Hobart's senior and formerly rector of St Andrew's Church in Hingham, Norfolk.

After 44 years of service, minister Peter Hobart died on January 20, 1679, on the eve of the building of the new house of worship. Hobart's diary of events in Hingham, begun in the year 1635, was continued on his death by his son David. By the time Old Ship was built, Harvard-educated Rev. John Norton, who had been ordained by Peter Hobart, had assumed Hobart's ministry. While Rev. Norton was the first pastor of the congregation at its new home in Old Ship Church, Rev. Peter Hobart was the founder of the congregation, although he died before the new meetinghouse was finished.

Old Ship Church deacon John Leavitt, whose son John married Rev. Hobart's daughter Bathsheba, was deacon when Old Ship was constructed and he argued forcefully for the construction of a new meetinghouse. The matter of replacing the old thatched log meeting house stirred intense emotion in Hingham, and it took two heated town meetings to settle on a site for the new edifice, which was built on land donated by Capt. Joshua Hobart, brother of Rev. Peter Hobart. Ultimately, the town appropriated £430 for the new building, said to be the equal of any in the Massachusetts Bay Colony. The modern frame edifice, devoid of ornamentation, was raised in 1681, and accommodated its first worship service the following year. Old Ship, with its stark wooden pulpit and stripped-down interior, could not have been further from the houses of worship known to many of the East Anglians who settled Hingham, Massachusetts. It was, in a sense, the anti-Wool church.

The program celebrating the 275th anniversary of the raising of the Old Ship Church in July 1956 described the raising of the meetinghouse:

The side galleries were added to the building in 1730 and 1755.

Originally the building was furnished with backless wooden benches, with the first box pews being installed in 1755.

In the Victorian period, the box pews were removed and replaced with curved pews fanning outward from the pulpit, while the walls were papered and drapes were added to the windows.  The church was restored to its current appearance, reflecting its 17th and 18th century characteristics, in 1930.

Current use
The current minister is Kenneth Read-Brown, a descendant of Rev. Peter Hobart. The congregation is Unitarian Universalist and is a Welcoming Congregation. Some of the meetinghouse furnishings still in use date to its founding: Old Ship's christening bowl, for instance, was made before 1600 and was likely brought to the Massachusetts Bay Colony by emigrants from Hingham, England.

Old Ship Burying Ground
Old Ship Church is surrounded by a large colonial graveyard amidst gently undulating hills. The graveyard, Hingham Cemetery, is sometimes called the First Settlers cemetery, though more commonly it is called Old Ship Church Cemetery, even though it is independent of the Old Ship Church. It was originally part of a  tract of land granted by the town to Thomas Gill, one of Hingham's earliest settlers. (It now comprises , and is the largest and oldest cemetery in Hingham.) Buried within its precincts are many of Hingham's earliest settlers and their descendants, including members of the Cushing, Hersey, Otis, Chaffee, Lane, Andrews, Hobart, Loring, Bates, Leavitt, Thaxter, Tower, Beal, Lincoln, Fearing and other prominent early families.

Among the prominent individuals buried in the graveyard are: Thomas Joy (1618–1678), builder of the first statehouse in Boston (the building was built of timber) and designer of the Old Ship Church; Rev. Peter Hobart (1604–1679), pastor of Old Ship Church, ancestor of Senator John Kerry; Edmund Hobart, father of Rev. Peter, instrumental in founding Hingham, ancestor of John Henry Hobart; William Hersey, one of Hingham's first settlers, ancestor of writer John Hersey; Col. Samuel Thaxter (1665–1740), one of "His Majesty's Council and Col. of His Regiment," delegate to the General Court and Hingham selectman; Col. Benjamin Lincoln (1699–1771), member of "His Majesty's Council," town selectman, town clerk, husband of Elizabeth Thaxter (daughter of Col. Samuel Thaxter), and father of Major General Benjamin Lincoln; Mrs. Sarah Langley Hersey Derby (1714–1790), founder of Derby Academy in Hingham, widow of Dr. Ezekiel Hersey and of Salem merchant Richard Derby, father of Elias Hasket Derby; Mary Revere Lincoln (1770–1853), daughter of Paul Revere; Governor John Albion Andrew (1818–1867), Civil War governor of Massachusetts, instrumental in founding the 54th and 55th Massachusetts Regiments, the first regiments of black infantry in the Civil War; John Davis Long (1838-1915), 32nd Governor of Massachusetts and Secretary of the Navy;(Wilmon Brewer (1895–1998), author/poet, philanthropist (major donations: Old Ordinary tavern to the town of Hingham, More-Brewer Conservation Area, World's End Park); Solomon Lincoln (1804–1881), Hingham attorney, author of first history of Hingham (1827), state senator, president of Boston's Webster Bank, and president of the Hingham Cemetery Corporation.

The oldest burials date from at least 1672, before the building of the current meeting house. The Settlers' Monument in Old Ship burying ground marks the place where the remains of Hingham's earliest settlers were moved after their initial burying place along modern-day Main Street, in front of Old Ship Church, was excavated for the passage of horse-drawn trolleys about 1835.

Memorial Bell Tower 

Also in the grounds, situated close to the church, is the Hingham Memorial Bell Tower, erected in 1912 to commemorate the 275th anniversary of the founding of Hingham, and in memory of the town's founders. The tower contains ten bells hung for change ringing, also made in 1912 by Mears & Stainbank, of Whitechapel, London. The bells were cast specifically in order to be similar to the bells hung in St Andrew's Church in Hingham, Norfolk, which the town's founders would have heard while living in England, and are tuned to the same key of E.

Gallery

See also
List of National Historic Landmarks in Massachusetts
National Register of Historic Places listings in Plymouth County, Massachusetts
First Unitarian Church in Westport
List of the oldest churches in the United States

Notes

Citations

References

External links

Official website
 National Historic Landmark listing
National Park Service Survey of Historic Sites and Buildings
 National Register listings for Plymouth County
Old Ship Historic Marker
Reverend Peter Hobart Historic Marker
 Historic Churches of America, Nellie Urner Wallington, 1907
Hingham Cemetery Facts, Lucinda Day (compiler), Hingham Cemetery Corporation

Churches completed in 1681
National Historic Landmarks in Massachusetts
Cemeteries on the National Register of Historic Places in Massachusetts
Unitarian Universalist churches in Massachusetts
New England Puritanism
Buildings and structures in Hingham, Massachusetts
Churches on the National Register of Historic Places in Massachusetts
Cemeteries in Plymouth County, Massachusetts
English Gothic architecture
National Register of Historic Places in Plymouth County, Massachusetts
Historic district contributing properties in Massachusetts
Gothic Revival architecture in Massachusetts
1681 establishments in Massachusetts
British colonial architecture in the United States
Colonial architecture in Massachusetts
17th-century churches in the United States
Churches in Plymouth County, Massachusetts
Cemeteries established in the 17th century